Zeng or Tsang was a historical state in China. The state existed during the time of the Zhou dynasty (1046–256 BC) and had territory in the area around Suizhou in modern Hubei province. Archaeological findings indicate that Zeng could have been the same state as Sui. The state of Zeng got attention partly because of the finding of Tomb of Marquis Yi of Zeng in 1978.

The center of the territory of Zeng was in the western part of Suizhou and findings indicate that the area reached up to the south west border of Henan province. Suizhou was an important military hub because of its strategic location towards the threatening state of Chu. The area was also an important transport route between Chinese Central Plateau and the copper findings at the middle Yangtze. All the tombs of the lords of Zeng state were found within 10 km from each other in Suizhou. 

A historical record indicate that the state of Zeng was founded during the time of Western Zhou (1045 – 771 BC) and had its peak of political ambitions in the beginning of Eastern Zhou (770–256 BC). Zeng still existed in the beginning of the Warring States period that started in the early 5th-century BC.

Zeng was mentioned in the historical chronicle Spring and Autumn Annals where also another state named Zeng was mentioned that was located in the Shandong province.

Relations with the state of Sui

In most of the earliest Chinese historical annals, Sui was the only state mentioned in the actual area around Suizhou in Hubei during the time for Eastern Zhou. Based on a few relics in the 1930s where the state of Zeng was mentioned, historian started to speculate that another state also existed in the area at the same time.

A large number of findings with inscriptions of  "Zeng" were found after 1949 in the territory of former Sui; this confirmed the speculation. 

After the finding of Tomb of Marquis Yi of Zeng in 1978 together with a large number of other well-preserved artefacts from the same area led to discussions around the relationship between Zeng and Sui, and many theories figured. On October 4, 1978 the historian Li Xueqin published the article "The Riddle of the State of Zeng" in Guangming Daily where he stated that the state of Zeng and Sui was the same place.

The professor Ren Wei from the Archaeology Department of Zhengzhou University had the theory that Zeng conquered and occupied the state of Sui, but the most supported theory is the one from Li Xueqin and it was common during the Eastern Zhou that one state use two names.

See also
 Sui (state)

References

Notes

Printed References

Ancient Chinese states
Zhou dynasty